What Price Porky is a 1938 Warner Bros. Looney Tunes cartoon directed by Bob Clampett. The cartoon was released on February 26, 1938, and stars Porky Pig and Daffy Duck.

Plot
When Porky goes to feed his hens and chickens, a group of ducks steal the corn he sets out. After sending a document filled with insults from the ducks' "ducktator" (Daffy Duck, a.k.a. "General Quacko"), war erupts between the chickens and the ducks. Newborn chicks form battalions from the moment they hatch, with the chickens digging trenches. The ducks goose-step in the marsh, saluting their general, as they use swans and geese as battlecarriers and airplanes. Porky manages to turn the tide with a machine gun improvised from a wringer washer and a bag of corn.

Production notes
The copyright date in the opening credits reads 1937.

Home media
What Price Porky is available on the DVD release of The Dawn Patrol, the Looney Tunes Golden Collection Volume 5, Disc 4 and the Porky Pig 101, Disc 2.

See also
 What Price Glory? (play)
 What Price Glory? (1926 film)

References

External links
 
 What Price Porky at the Big Cartoon Database

1938 films
1938 animated films
1938 war films
Looney Tunes shorts
American black-and-white films
Films directed by Bob Clampett
1930s American animated films
Daffy Duck films
Porky Pig films
American war films